Jacksonville Mall is a shopping mall located in Jacksonville, North Carolina. It is anchored by Belk and JCPenney. The mall is located near Camp Lejeune.

History 
Crown American Realty Trust purchased Jacksonville Mall from Beckley-Jacksonville LP for $38 million in 1998. The mall was an American Red Cross location after Hurricane Floyd in 1999. Belk received a major renovation and minor expansion in mid-2012. The mall suffered serious roof damage during September 2018's Hurricane Florence, with only a few stores having no damage. Jacksonville Mall had previously not suffered this amount of damage. Most stores reopened by November 2018 for Black Friday, with Barnes & Noble and Belk remaining closed. Barnes & Noble reopened in late January 2019. Belk reopened in late April 2019 after repairing serious hurricane damage. Sears closed in spring 2020.

References

External links
 Jacksonville Mall official website
 Jacksonville Mall - Pennsylvania Real Estate Investment Trust website

Shopping malls in North Carolina
Buildings and structures in Onslow County, North Carolina
Tourist attractions in Onslow County, North Carolina
Shopping malls established in 1981
1981 establishments in North Carolina
Pennsylvania Real Estate Investment Trust